Dongkuk Ahn (Daw-non) (1937-2013), also known as Don Ahn, was a South Korean artist and t'ai chi master who resided in New York City.

Background
Don Ahn was born in Seoul, Korea. He studied at Seoul University (BFA), graduate student at Miami University, Oxford Ohio 1962, Pratt Institute (MFA), and New York University (Ph. D, Art History).  He was also a student of the T'ai Chi grandmaster Cheng Man-ch'ing in New York City.

Career as artist

Themes and influences 

Ahn's work is greatly influenced by nature, specifically the cycles of nature as in Zen and other Eastern philosophies. Ascribing to the Eastern belief that nature is central to everything that exists, Ahn paints natural forms and environments, which he abstracts into brushstrokes, drips, and splatters. Titles of his paintings reference trees, wind, and water, and include Broken Branch in the Rain, Old Zen Tree, and Wind, Rain, & Ocean. His swirls and drips portray the rapid, random, and untamed effects of natural forces.

Another influence or concept in Ahn's work is the dragon, a good and powerful figure from Korean and Chinese mythology, whose movements and forms Ahn suggests in whimsical ribbon-like marks and trails of paint. In Korean folk tales, dragons show goodwill to humans by sending clouds and rain, and they tend to live in lakes, rivers, and oceans. Paying tribute to this Folkloric legacy, Ahn's paintings bear titles such as Brown Dragon and Yellow Dragon, as well as titles using names of underwater creatures and habitats, like Phantasy in the Deep Sea.

Style and technique
Ahn's ink and acrylic paintings on canvas are reminiscent of Zen Calligraphy and paintings, with their quick brushstrokes and elegant compositions. Composed of swipes and spatters that course across the pictorial field, these works blend Eastern brush painting with Abstract Expressionist "action painting." In his catalog essay, Jeffrey Wechsler remarks at "how completely even the most explosive of (the marks) ultimately resolve within the paintings as compositional pivots and Focal points of visual weight, but without reducing their sense of unbound energy" which he calls a "zen-like paradox." He writes, "Somehow, speed becomes the medium for suggesting presence and substance."

The white paper background accounts for a large percentage of the surfaces of Ahn's works, but to Ahn, these areas are not characteristic of Western "negative space." Instead, as in Eastern Philosophy, empty space or the void is full of Tao (the fullness of existence) and ch'i (the energy within it).

Exhibitions
Ahn has had numerous solo and group exhibitions in the U.S. and abroad, including the solo shows Dragons & Oceans at Ehwa Gallery, Seoul, South Korea in 2007, and Zen & Void at Walter Wickiser Gallery, New York, NY in 2004. His work is in private and public collections, including The Museum of Modern Art, New York, the Dayton Art Museum, Ohio, and the Evansville Museum, Indiana. Awards and honors include First Prize (in painting) from the Dayton Art Museum Ohio Regional Art Annual in 1963, the Pratt Graduate Fellowship in 1963, First Prize (in etching) from East Coast Printmaker's Annual in 1964, and the McDowell Artist Fellowship in 1964.

Selected solo exhibitions
 2014  Don Ahn: Spirit, BBCN Bank, New York, NY
 2014  Don Ahn (1937-2013), Walter Wickiser Gallery, New York, NY
 2012  Paintings From 1968 Through 2005, Walter Wickiser Gallery, New York, NY
 2007	Dragons & Oceans, Ehwa Gallery, Seoul, South Korea
 2004	Zen & Vold, Walter Wickiser Gallery, New York, NY
 2000	Walter Wickiser Gallery, New York, NY
 1996	Walter Wickiser Gallery, New York, NY
 1994	Walter Wickiser Gallery, New York, NY
 1993	Walter Wickiser Gallery, New York, NY
 1982	Hankuk Gallery, New York, NY
 1977	Lotus Gallery, New York, NY
 1976	Lotus Gallery, New York, NY
 1975	Lotus Gallery, New York, NY
 1972	Green Mountain Gallery, New York, NY
 1972	Westbeth Gallery, New York, NY
 1971	Westbeth Gallery, New York, NY
 1971	Dalhousie Gallery, Nova Scotia, Canada
 1969	Downey Museum, Los Angeles, CA 1965	Evansville Museum, Evansville, IN
 1963	Dayton Art Museum, Dayton, OH
 1952	Kilbride Bradley Gallery, Minneapolis, MN
 1950	Korean Do-Su-Kwan Gallery, Seoul, South Korea

Selected group exhibitions
 2013  Coloring Time, Korean Cultural Service, New York, NY
 2013  Friends, Walter Wickiser Gallery, New York, NY
 2011  Friends, Walter Wickiser Gallery, New York, NY
 2011  Art Toronto, Toronto, Canada
 2011  Art Chicago, Chicago, IL
 2010  Art Toronto, Toronto, Canada
 2008  Gallery Artists Part V, Walter Wickiser Gallery, New York, NY
 2002	Eastern Essence, Gary Snyder Gallery, New York, NY
 2002	500 Best Works On Paper, Gary Snyder Gallery, New York, NY
 2001	Abstract Expressionism, Gary Snyder Gallery, New York, NY
 1999 	Pleides Gallery, Seoul University Alumni show, New York, NY
 1999	Korean New York Art Society Show, Jersey City, NJ
 1999	Fukuoka Asian Art Museum Fukuoka, Japan
 1999	Artist of the Third Millennium, Walter Wickiser Gallery, New York, NY
 1998	Kaohsiung Museum Of Fine Arts, Taipei, Taiwan
 1997	Chicago Institute Of Art, Chicago, IL
 1997	Zimmerli Museum, Rutgers University
 1997	Asian Tradition & Modern Expression: 1945 - 1970, Zimmerli Museum, Rutgers University
 1995	Walter Wickiser Gallery, New York, NY
 1993 	Walter Wickiser Gallery, New York, NY
 1976 	Lotus Gallery, New York
 1972	Westbeth Gallery, New York, NY
 1971	US National Print Biennial, Museum Of Modern Art, Tokyo, Japan
 1969 	Cooper Union, faculty show, New York, NY
 1968	6th Invitational International Print Biennial, Museum Of Modern Art, Tokyo, Japan
 1967	International Print Biennial, Grenchen, Switzerland
 1967	Audubon, National Annual, New York, NY
 1966 	Society of American Graphic Artists, National Annual, New York, NY
 1966 	Ball State College, National, Drawing and Sculpture, Muncie, IN
 1966  Traveling U.S. Print Show, Pratt Graphic Arts Center, New York, NY
 1965	Traveling U.S. Print Show, Pratt Graphic Arts Center, New York, NY
 1964	New York, Institute of Technology, faculty show New York, NY
 1964	Evansville Museum, Indiana
 1964	East Coast Printmakers, Village Art Center, New York, NY
 1963 	Ohio Regional Art Show, Dayton Art Institute, OH
 1963	Drawing and Prints from the collection of J.Johnson, Cincinnati Museum of Art, OH
 1962	Seattle Worlds Fair, Korean Booth, Seattle, WA
 1958	Korean National Art Annual (Kuk-Jun), Seoul, South Korea
 1954	Korean National Art Annual (Kuk-Jun), Seoul, South Korea

Awards and honors
 1964	First Prize (in Etching), East Coast Printmakers Annual
 1964	McDowell Artist Fellowship, NH
 1963	First Prize (In Painting), Dayton Art Museum, Ohio Regional Art Annual, Juror: Howard Arnason, Vice President, Guggenheim Museum, New York, NY
 1963	Pratt Graduate Fellowship, New York, NY

Selected public and private collections
Museum Of Modern Art, New York, NY
Dayton Art Museum, Dayton, OH
Evansville, Museum, Evansville, IN
C.W. Post College, Brookville, NY
Farrington Collection, Calgary, Canada
Campbell Collection, Cold Spring, NY
Collection D.J. Nam, Seoul, South Korea
Collection of Thomas W. Thompson, Dayton, OH

Career as t'ai chi master
Master Ahn studied with the late Professor Cheng, Man Ching (6 years from 1964), followed by study with Yang, Sui Chong (the eldest son of Yang, Cheng Fu) in 1970 Hong Kong.  He teaches several Taoist disciplines: he has trained in Korean Tae Kwondo (1949-1953), Korean Zen (1955-1959), and has practiced other Taoist disciplines for over 30 years.

Master Ahn learned acupressure techniques in his childhood from his grandfather, and studied Korean and Japanese Shiatsu intermittently from 1953, as well as various Western forms of body work since 1960.  Ahn's Chi Bodywork is the result of this harmonizing of both the Eastern and Western methods.

He was known for his focus on Dantian and Rooting power, and taught Professor Cheng's 37-form, as well as Push Hands, Sword, Knife, Double Knife, Da Lu, Wu Chi Breathing, and Taoist meditation.

References

 Cotter, Holland, "Of Asians Among the Abstractionists",The New York Times 2007
 Wechsler, Jeffrey,Asian Traditions, Modern Expressions 1945-1970, New York, NY: Harry N. Abrams, 1997.
 Community Leaders of America, 1981
 Notable Americans, 1981
 Who's who in the East, 1981

External links 
 Ahn Tai Chi Studio
 Taij Union: About Don Ahn
 Claims of Chi: Besting a Tai Chi Master

1937 births
2013 deaths
New York University Institute of Fine Arts alumni
Artists from Seoul
Pratt Institute alumni
Seoul National University alumni
South Korean artists
South Korean expatriates in the United States